Warpe may refer to:

 Warpe, Lower Saxony, a municipality in Germany
 Warpes, an ethnic group of Argentina
 Warpe languages

See also 
 Warp (disambiguation)
 Varpe, a village in Estonia
 Wörpe, a river in Germany

Language and nationality disambiguation pages